Armina is a genus of sea slugs, specifically nudibranchs, marine gastropod mollusks in the family Arminidae.

Species 
Species within the genus Armina include:

Armina adami (White, 1955)
Armina aoteana (Miller & Willan, 1986)
 Armina appendiculata Baba, 1949
Armina babai (Tchang, 1934)
Armina ballesterosi (Ortea, 1989)
Armina bayeri (Marcus & Marcus, 1966)
 Armina bilamella Lin, 1981
Armina californica (J.G. Cooper, 1863)
Armina capensis (Bergh, 1907)
Armina cara Marcus, 1971
Armina carneola (Lim & Chou, 1970)
 Armina cinerea (Farran, 1905)
Armina comta (Bergh, 1880)
Armina convolvula (Lance, 1962)
Armina cordellensis (Gosliner & Behrens, 1996)
Armina cuvierii (Orbigny, 1837)
Armina cygnea (Bergh, 1876)
Armina elongata (Ardila & Valdes, 2004)
Armina euchroa (Bergh, 1907)
Armina formosa (Kelaart, 1858)
Armina gilchristi (White, 1955)
Armina grisea (O'Donoghue, 1929)
Armina henneguyi (Labbé, 1922)
Armina japonica (Eliot, 1913)
Armina joia (Marcus & Marcus, 1966)
Armina juliana (Ardila & Diaz, 2002)
Armina liouvillei (Pruvot-Fol, 1953)
 Armina longicauda Lin, 1981
Armina loveni (Bergh, 1866)
Armina maculata (Rafinesque, 1814)
Armina magna (Baba, 1955)
Armina major (Baba, 1949)
Armina microdonta (Bergh, 1907)
Armina muelleri (Ihering, 1886)
Armina natalensis (Bergh, 1866)
Armina neapolitana (delle Chiaje, 1824)
Armina papillata (Baba, 1933)
 Armina paucifoliata Baba, 1955
 Armina punctilopsis Lin, 1992
 Armina punctilucens (Bergh, 1874)
Armina punctulata (Lin, 1990)
Armina pustulosa (Schultz in Philippi, 1836) 
Armina semperi (Bergh, 1860)
Armina serrata (O'Donoghue, 1929)
 Armina sinensis Lin, 1981
Armina taeniolata (Bergh, 1860)
Armina tigrina (Rafinesque, 1814) : type species
Armina tricuspidata (Thompson, Cattaneo, & Wong, 1990)
Armina undulata (Meckel, 1823) 
Armina variolosa (Bergh, 1904)
Armina wattla (Marcus & Marcus, 1967)
Armina xandra (Marcus & Marcus, 1966)
 Armina sp. Pierre's armina

Species brought into synonymy
Armina abbotti (Thompson, Cattaneo, & Wong, 1990): synonym of Armina wattla Ev. Marcus & Er. Marcus, 1967
Armina columbiana (O'Donoghue, 1924): synonym of Armina californica (J. G. Cooper, 1863)
 Armina convolvula Lance, 1962: synonym of Histiomena marginata (Oersted in Mørch, 1859)
Armina digueti (Pruvot-Fol, 1955): synonym of Armina californica (J. G. Cooper, 1863)
 Armina mulleri (Ihering, 1886): synonym of Armina muelleri (Ihering, 1886)
Armina vancouverensis (Bergh, 1876): synonym of Armina californica (J. G. Cooper, 1863)

References
 Vaught, K.C. (1989). A classification of the living Mollusca. American Malacologists: Melbourne, FL (USA). . XII, 195 pp.
 Gofas, S.; Le Renard, J.; Bouchet, P. (2001). Mollusca, in: Costello, M.J. et al. (Ed.) (2001). European register of marine species: a check-list of the marine species in Europe and a bibliography of guides to their identification. Collection Patrimoines Naturels, 50: pp. 180–213

 https://web.archive.org/web/20110718215743/http://folk.ntnu.no/vmzotbak/nudibranchia/arminidae/armina_loveni.htm accessed 9 November 2009
 http://www.catalogueoflife.org/ accessed 9 November 2009
Gary R. McDonald, University of California Santa Cruz; 29 July 2006, "Nudibranch Systematic Index", University of California Santa Cruz
 Miller M.C. & Willan R.C. 1986. A review of New Zealand arminacean nudibranchs (Opisthobranchia: Arminacea). New Zealand Journal of Zoology, 13: 377-408

External links 
 

Arminidae
Taxa named by Constantine Samuel Rafinesque

it:Armina